Sydney T. Ellis (July 2, 1848 – October 9, 1911) was an American politician who served in the Virginia House of Delegates. He later served as County Treasurer for Nansemond.

He and his wife had multiple children:
Their son was named E. S. Ellis.
Their daughter, Alma Ellis, studied in Paris and later married fellow student and Saxony-native Emil Hoernecke in November 1896.

Ellis died on October 9, 1911, and was buried at Cedar Hill Cemetery.

References

External links 

1848 births
1911 deaths
Democratic Party members of the Virginia House of Delegates
19th-century American politicians